Automatic data processing (ADP) may refer to:
 Automatic Data Processing, a computing services company.
 Data processing using mechanical or electronic equipment, Electronic data processing